The Belarusian opposition consists of groups and individuals in Belarus seeking to challenge, from 1988 to 1991, the authorities of Soviet Belarus, and since 1995, the leader of the country Alexander Lukashenko, whom supporters of the movement often consider to be a dictator. Supporters of the movement tend to call for a parliamentary democracy based on a Western model, with freedom of speech and political and religious pluralism.

Background

The modern Belarusian democracy movement originated in the late 1980s when Mikhail Gorbachev's Perestroika and the Chernobyl disaster exposed the serious shortcomings of the Soviet system and galvanized a significant section of Belarusians around the issues of environment, de-Stalinization, national revival and democratic change.

The dissolution of the Soviet Union brought about a brief period of democracy from 1991 to 1994. However, since his election in 1994, Alexander Lukashenko established an authoritarian rule creating a political system which the United Nations Human Rights Council (UNHRC) stated is "incompatible with the concept of human rights".

History

1988 anti-Soviet protests 
On 3 June 1988 the Minsk-based weekly "Litaratura i mastatstva" ("Literature And Art") published an article by archeologists Zianon Pazniak and Yauhen Shmyhalyou about the unearthing of 500 mass graves of Stalinist victims in Kurapaty on the outskirts of the Belarusian capital. The article was the first publication in Belarus about crimes of the Soviet-era authorities. This was followed in October that year by the establishment of the Martyrology of Belarus to commemorate the victims of communism, and an organizational committee for the creation of the Belarusian Popular Front, which subsequently became an ardent advocate of Belarus's independence from the Soviet Union.

On 30 October 1988, riot police in Minsk violently dispersed a mass demonstration to commemorate the victims of Stalinism at Kurapaty – the first of many such clashes in modern Belarusian history.

Establishment of the Belarusian Popular Front  
On 24 and 25 June, 1989 the Belarusian Popular Front “Revival” was formally established with Pazniak as chairman.

1991 Belarusian Strikes 

The 1991 Belarusian Strikes were a series of nationwide strikes and pro-independence rallies against the Soviet authorities and their policies. Falling living standards and unemployment along with Glasnost and Perestroika policies also sparked massive demonstrations and unrest by mostly young people, demanding democracy and leading labour protests across Belarus.

In 1990, Belarus held its first competitive parliamentary elections to the Supreme Soviet, which upon the dissolution of the Soviet Union declared Belarus an independent nation.

Election of Lukashenko 
On 19 June 1994 Belarus held its first presidential election, won by Lukashenko. From 1995 he began to consolidate his power at the expense of the Parliament and other institutions.

Minsk Spring (1996–97) 

A series of mass street protests called “Minsk Spring” or “Belarusian Spring” took place in the springs of 1996–97 triggered by a constitutional referendum on amendments to the 1994 Constitution of Belarus. The Belarusian political system became increasingly authoritarian with the government seeking to curtail all political freedoms.

Charter 97 

Charter 97 is a human rights group taking its inspiration from the 1997 declaration calling for democracy in Belarus. The document – whose title deliberately echoes the Czechoslovak human rights declaration Charter 77 twenty years earlier – was created on the anniversary of the referendum held in 1996, and which, in the words of the organization, declares "devotion to the principles of independence, freedom and democracy, respect to the human rights, solidarity with everybody, who stands for elimination of dictatorial regime and restoration of democracy in Belarus."

Freedom March (1999)

On 17 October 1999, dozens of Belarusians took to the streets to rally against the impending implementation of the Union State of Belarus with Russia, forming a confederation and ending Belarus' independence. In response to the march, the Belarusian government suspended further integration between the two states.

Jeans Revolution (2006)

The Jeans Revolution was a term used by the opposition in Belarus and its supporters to describe their effort and aspirations on democratic changes in Belarus, in the period leading up to the 2006 presidential election.

2010 presidential election

After the 2010 Belarusian presidential election, up to 40,000 people protested against Lukashenko. Up to 700 opposition activists, including 7 presidential candidates, were arrested in the post-election crackdown.

Several websites of the opposition and opposition candidates were also blocked or hacked. Facebook, Twitter, YouTube, Google Talk, many email services and LiveJournal were also blocked. The headquarters of Charter 97, the opposition group and website, was stormed by Lukashenko's security forces and all of its staff were arrested.

According to The Independent, Lukashenko's security forces went after his opponents "with a ferocity that would not have looked out of place in Soviet times".

2011 protests

A series of protests influenced by a serious economic crisis took place in 2011. As a result of these protests, on 29 July, the government banned assemblies and gatherings.

2017 protests

Due to an ongoing economic recession, continuing since the last series of protests in 2015, due to falling gasoline prices, that year a law was passed taxing the unemployed. Roughly 470,000 Belarusians are obliged to pay the tax but only about 10% have since it was issued.

Approximately 2,500 protesters filled the streets in the capital of Belarus, Minsk, on 17 February to protest a policy that required those who work for less than 183 days per year to pay USD$250 for "lost taxes" to help fund welfare policies. This converts to approximately Rbls 5 million—a half-month's wages. The law has proven unpopular and has been mocked in the public as the "law against social parasites". On 19 February, another 2,000 demonstrated in the second city of Homieĺ. Both gatherings were peaceful. Smaller demonstrations were held in other cities.

On 25 March, opposition leader Vladimir Nekliayev, who was set to speak at the main protest, was allegedly stopped in the morning on his way to Minsk.

The government defended the mass arrests and beatings against citizens by alleging that the police had found "petrol bombs and arms-laden cars" near a protest in Minsk.

2020 presidential election and protests

In May 2020, a lowered approval of Lukashenko amid his handling of the COVID-19 pandemic led to street protests and the blogger Sergei Tikhanovsky labeling Lukashenko as a cockroach as in the children's poem "The Monster Cockroach", referring to a slipper signifying stamping the insect. Many opposition candidates registered for the next election as a result of the movement, but many of them were arrested.

Mass protests erupted across Belarus following the 2020 Belarusian presidential election which was marred by allegations of widespread electoral fraud. Subsequently, opposition presidential candidate Sviatlana Tsikhanouskaya, Tikhanovsky's wife, claimed she had won the presidential election with between 60 and 70% of the vote and formed a Coordination Council to facilitate the peaceful and orderly transfer of power in Belarus. Online groups on Telegram such as Nexta, as well as smaller decentralised groups, played an important role in the spread of information and coordination of opposition activities.

Freedom Day
Freedom Day (Dzień Voli) is an unofficial holiday in Belarus celebrated on 25 March to commemorate the declaration of independence by the Belarusian Democratic Republic by the Third Constituent Charter on that date in 1918. The day has been used annually by the Belarusian democracy movement to protest against Alexander Lukashenko since his election.

2022 Russian invasion of Ukraine

Protests emerged from the Belarusian opposition condemning Lukashenko's support and involvement with the 2022 Russian invasion of Ukraine on 27 February 2022, shortly after the war's beginning. According to the Ministry of Internal Affairs, over 800 people had been detained for involvement within these protests. Activists from the opposition later engaged in activity to support Ukraine in the conflict, including attacks on the Belarusian Railway, a state railroad which had been utilized by Russia to support the Kyiv offensive.

Opposition parties and organisations

Rada of the Belarusian Democratic Republic
Belarusian Popular Front "Revival"
"
Belarus Free Theatre
Belarusian Christian Democracy
Belarusian Green Party
Belarusian Women's Party "Nadzieja"

Party of Freedom and Progress
Social Democratic Assembly
United Civic Party of Belarus
Young Front
Belarusian Social Democratic Party (Assembly)
United Civic Party
A Just World
BPF Party
Conservative Christian Party – BPF

Day of Solidarity with Belarus
Freedom Day (Belarus)

International support

Organizations
 The European Union has enforced sanctions against Lukashenko's government.

Governments

The following governments have given diplomatic support to the Belarusian democracy movement:

See also

A Lesson of Belarusian
Pieramoha Plan, a plan organized by the Belarusian opposition to peacefully take power in Belarus and replace Lukashenko and his regime
Russian opposition
Kazakh opposition
Chinese democracy movement
Kastuś Kalinoŭski Regiment

References

External link
Charter97, opposition news website

 
Democracy movements by country
Political opposition
Politics of Belarus